The Words You Don't Swallow is the first full-length studio album by American pop rock band Anarbor. The band recorded the album with Mike Green (who has also recorded for Paramore, Set Your Goals, and Spill Canvas). Their debut album was released on April 20, 2010. The album gets its name from lyrics in the song "Contagious." The album peaked at number 50 on Billboards Independent Albums chart  and number 16 on the Heatseekers chart.

Track listing
 "Contagious"
 "Drugstore Diet"
 "Gypsy Woman"
 "Mr. Big Shot"
 "Let the Games Begin"
 "Going to Jail"
 "The Whole World"
 "Carefree Highway"
 "I Do What I Do"
 "This Can't Be Healthy"
 "Useless"

Singles
"Gypsy Woman"
"Useless"

References

2010 debut albums
Anarbor albums
Hopeless Records albums